Cecil John Patterson   (9 January 190811 April 1992) was an Anglican bishop in the mid part of the 20th century.

He was born in London, educated at St Paul's and St Catharine's College, Cambridge. He trained for ordination at Bishops' College, Cheshunt and was ordained deacon in 1931 and priest in 1932. He was a Curate at Holy Innocents, Kingsbury (1931–34) and then a Missionary in south Nigeria before his appointment to the episcopate as Assistant Bishop (1942) then Bishop on the Niger (1945). He was ordained and consecrated a bishop by Cosmo Lang, Archbishop of Canterbury, at St Paul's Cathedral, on Candlemas (2 February) 1942. In 1961 he became Archbishop of the Church of the Province of West Africa.

He retired in 1969 and his grave is in Richmond Cemetery. He had become a Doctor of Divinity (DD).

References

1908 births
1992 deaths
Anglican clergy from London
People educated at St Paul's School, London
Alumni of Bishops' College, Cheshunt
Alumni of St Catharine's College, Cambridge
Holders of a Lambeth degree
20th-century Anglican bishops in Nigeria
Anglican bishops on the Niger
20th-century Anglican archbishops
Companions of the Order of St Michael and St George
Commanders of the Order of the British Empire
English Anglican missionaries
Anglican missionaries in Nigeria
Anglican archbishops of West Africa